The American Red Cross Nursing Service  was organized in 1909 by Jane Arminda Delano (1862-1919). A nurse and member of the American Red Cross, Delano organized the nursing service as the reserve of the Army Nurse Corps to be ready just before the entry of the United States into World War I.  Key wartime decisions were made by  Delano along with Mary Adelaide Nutting, president of the American Federation of Nurses, and Annie Warburton Goodrich, dean of the Army School of Nursing.

See also
 History of nursing in the United States

Notes

American Red Cross
Nursing organizations in the United States